Qazaxlar (also, Kazakhlar and Kazakhyar) is a village in the Goranboy Rayon of Azerbaijan.  The village forms part of the municipality of Borsunlu.

References 

Populated places in Goranboy District